This is a list of Canadian flying aces.

World War I (1914–1918)

The following is a list of Canadians that achieved 5 or more victories during World War I. They achieved this while flying for the Royal Flying Corps, the Royal Naval Air Service, or the Royal Air Force.

World War II (1939–1945)

The following is a list of Canadians that achieved 5 or more victories during World War II.

Multiple wars

The following is a list of Canadians that achieved 5 or more victories throughout multiple wars.

Notes

Sources
Air Aces on Safarikovi.org
Aces on TheAeroDrome.com

External links
Canadian Aces of ww2 at acesofww2.com

 
Air Aces